Infundibulum is a genus of sea snails, marine gastropod mollusks in the family Trochidae, the top snails.

Description
The conical shell is false-umbilicate. The periphery is angular. The base of the shell is nearly flat, or concave. The outer surface is smooth, costate or granular. The outer lip is not lirate within. The columella is  inserted in the center of the axis. It is more or less folded above, its edge straight, oblique, not toothed, and without a notch at its base.

Species
Species within the genus Infundibulum include:
 Infundibulum concavum (Gmelin, 1791)
 Infundibulum tomlini (Fulton, 1930)

The Indo-Pacific Molluscan Database also includes the following species: 
 Infundibulum aemulans A. Adams, 1854

Synonyms
 Infundibulum (Lamprostoma) Swainson, 1840: synonym of Trochus Linnaeus, 1758
 Infundibulum baccatus Sowerby, G.B. III, 1889: synonym of Trochus cariniferus Reeve, L.A., 1842
 Infundibulum calcaratum (Souverbie in Souverbie & Montrouzier, 1874): synonym of Trochus calcaratus Souverbie in Souverbie & Montrouzier, 1875
 Infundibulum cariniferum (Reeve, 1842): synonym of Infundibulops cariniferus (Reeve, 1842)
 Infundibulum chloromphalus A. Adams, 1851: synonym of Trochus chloromphalus (A. Adams, 1851)
 Infundibulum erythraeum (Brocchi, 1821): synonym of Infundibulops erythraeus Brocchi, G.B., 1821
 Infundibulum typus Montfort, 1810: synonym of Infundibulum concavum (Gmelin, 1791)
Nomen dubium
 Infundibulum depressum Say, T., 1826

References

 Marshall B.A. (2000) Systematics of the genus Infundibulum Montfort, 1810 (Gastropoda: Trochidae). The Nautilus 114(4):149-154

External links

 
Trochidae
Gastropod genera